Paderno d'Adda is a town and comune in the province of Lecco, in Lombardy. It is well known in the rest of Italy for the cast-iron San Michele Bridge built in the late nineteenth century following the Tour Eiffel style. It is said that Leonardo da Vinci used the Paderno's scenery as base for his famous painting Virgin of the Rocks.

References

Cities and towns in Lombardy